Fleisher Yarn began as an amateur company soccer club of the SB & BW Fleisher Manufacturing Company in Philadelphia and quickly became a national amateur soccer power. They won the Philadelphia Industrial League championship in 1920/21, both the Allied Amateur Cup of Philadelphia and Philadelphia's Telegraph Cup in 1922, a "quadruple" in 1923 winning the Allied Amateur League, the Allied Amateur League Cup, the Allied Amateur Cup, and the American Cup (the last by defeating the professional J&P Coats of the American Soccer League), and the inaugural National Amateur Cup.

Fleisher became a professional team and joined the American Soccer League in 1924. After one mediocre season the club folded.

Year-by-year

References

Soccer clubs in Philadelphia
Defunct soccer clubs in Pennsylvania
American Soccer League (1921–1933) teams
1925 disestablishments in Pennsylvania
Association football clubs disestablished in 1925
Works soccer clubs in the United States